Charles James Lee (2 March 1870 – 11 May 1956) was a British author. He published five novels in the late 19th and early 20th centuries, in addition to many short stories and plays about the working people of Cornwall.

Life 
Charles Lee was born in London to an artistic family. He was educated at Highgate School, was awarded a BA from London University in 1889 and published his first novel, Widow Woman, in 1896. Suffering from bad health, he visited Cornwall in 1900 for its better climate, and stayed in Cornwall for seven years. There he lived amongst the group of artists who formed the Newlyn School. His Cornish Tales had an introduction by Sir Arthur Quiller-Couch.

After relocating to the London suburbs, he worked as senior editor for J. M. Dent, where, owing to his talent for editing prose, he came to be known as "the man with the green pen."

Works
Widow Woman, 1896
Our Little Town 
Paul Carah Cornishman 
Dorinda's Birthday 
Cynthia in the West  
Chasing Tales: The Lost Stories of Charles Lee, editor Simon Parker, (Giss 'On Books, 2002)
 The Stuffed Owl: an anthology of bad verse (with D.B. Wyndham Lewis) (Dent, London, 1930; enlarged 1948; reissued 2003)

As well as a number of short stories he wrote several plays, journals, and musical scores and a guide book of St Mawgan:- The Vale of Lanherne, . In collaboration with D.B. Wyndham Lewis he compiled The Stuffed Owl, an anthology of bad (mainly inappropriate and bathetic) verse, a volume reissued by New York Review Books Classics in 2003 with an introduction by Billy Collins.

Despite contemporary acclaim, he is almost forgotten today.

References

External links
http://www.cornwall-calling.co.uk/famous-cornish-people/lee.htm
 
Charles Lee at The New York Review of Books (as at 2014)

1870 births
1956 deaths
People educated at Highgate School
Newlyn School of Artists
British male novelists
Dramatists and playwrights from Cornwall
Novelists from Cornwall
19th-century British novelists
20th-century British novelists
19th-century English male writers
20th-century English male writers